"The Departed" is an episode of the BBC sitcom, The Green Green Grass. It was screened on 12 February 2009, as the sixth episode of the fourth series.

Synopsis
Tyler is preparing for his first gig with his band, Puddle of Agony. He has booked a venue at the university and Boycie and Marlene are driving him down with all the kit in the boot. Left alone to look after The Grange, the staff head down to the pub where they get talking to Natasha and Ian, two psychic detectives who are in the area seeking phantoms and ghouls. They work for Paranormal Monthly magazine and are offering £5,000 for the photo of a ghost. Spotting a way to make some money, Elgin offers them the run of a haunted thirty-room manor house.

Episode cast

Production, broadcast and reception

Broadcast
This episode has not yet been broadcast.

Writer and cast
Keith R. Lindsay writes this episode. This is his first episode of the fourth series.

Notes

References

British TV Comedy Guide for The Green Green Grass
BARB viewing figures

2009 British television episodes
The Green Green Grass episodes